Tianhe East railway station (Tianhedong railway station), formerly known as Jishan railway station, is a railway station in Jishan, Dongpu, Tianhe District, Guangzhou, Guangdong, China. It is a station on the Guangshen Railway and managed by the Guangshen Railway Company. It was built in 1916 and is a class 3 station on the national railway station scale.

References

Railway stations in China opened in 1916
Railway stations in Guangzhou
Stations on the Guangzhou–Shenzhen Railway